The 2015 Alabama A&M Bulldogs football team represented Alabama Agricultural and Mechanical University (Alabama A&M) in the 2015 NCAA Division I FCS football season. The Bulldogs were led by second-year head coach James Spady and played their home games at Louis Crews Stadium. They were a member of the East Division of the Southwestern Athletic Conference. They finished the season 3–8, 3–6 in SWAC play to finish in a tie for third place in the East Division.

Schedule

Source: Schedule

References

Alabama AandM
Alabama AandM Bulldogs football team
Alabama A&M Bulldogs football seasons